Active Citizens of Electoral Formation was a political party in Guatemala.

History
Active Citizens of Electoral Formation was founded in 2011. The founder of the party is Dinora Cabrera, and the ideology of the party is Humanist, CAFE was registered in the Supreme Electoral Tribunal in 2015 upon reaching the number of members required for registration. It has been suspended since 2016 by the same electoral body. 
It was canceled in July 2018 for not having the necessary requirements for its validity.

References

External links

2015 establishments in Guatemala
2018 disestablishments in Guatemala
Centrist parties in North America
Defunct political parties in Guatemala
Political parties disestablished in 2018
Political parties established in 2015